"Down Down" is a song by English rock band Status Quo. Written by Francis Rossi and Bob Young and produced by Status Quo, "Down Down" was Status Quo's only number one single on the UK Singles Chart. The single spent a week at the top of the chart in January 1975. It was released on 29 November 1974 on the Vertigo label, paired with the B-side song "Nightride". Both songs came from the album On the Level, which had yet to be released. The album version lasts 5 minutes and 24 seconds, whilst the single version is 3 minutes and 49 seconds.

Song information
"Down Down" was inspired by T. Rex's debut single "Debora". Originally it was titled "Get Down", but this was changed before release, possibly to avoid confusion with the Gilbert O'Sullivan song of the same name.

Towards the end of his life, DJ John Peel was known for playing "Down Down" as part of his eclectic DJ sets.

In 1986 co-writer Bob Young recorded a country style version of the song to open his solo album In Quo Country.

In July 2012, Status Quo reworked the lyrics to create a three-minute promotional song for the Australian supermarket chain Coles. The chorus chants, "down, down, prices are down". This was released on television and YouTube, the most notable of which depicted a mince rally.

The song was reprised, in 2014, for the band's thirty-first studio album Aquostic (Stripped Bare). It was featured in the ninety-minute launch performance of the album at London's Roundhouse on 22 October and recorded and broadcast live by BBC Radio 2 as part of their In Concert series.

Charts

Weekly charts

Year-end charts

Certifications

References

1975 singles
British songs
UK Singles Chart number-one singles
Status Quo (band) songs
Songs written by Francis Rossi
Songs written by Bob Young (musician)
Songs used as jingles
1975 songs
Vertigo Records singles